The Leyte sphenomorphus (Pinoyscincus llanosi)  is a species of skink, a lizard in the family Scincidae. The species is endemic to the Philippines.

Etymology
The specific name, llanosi, is in honor of Dominican priest Father Florencio Llanos, who was Director of the University of Santo Tomas, Philippines.

Geographic range
P. llanosi is found in the central Philippines, on the islands Leyte and Samar.

Habitat

Description

Reproduction
The mode of reproduction of P. llanosi is unknown.

References

Further reading
Brown WC, Alcala AC (1980). Philippine Lizards of the Family Scincidae. Dumaguete, Philippines: Silliman University Natural Science Monograph Series. x + 246 pp. (Sphenomorphus llanosi, p. 212).
Linkem CW, Diesmos AC, Brown RM (2011). "Molecular systematics of the Philippine forest skinks (Squamata: Scincidae: Sphenomorphus): testing morphological hypotheses of interspecific relationships". Zoological Journal of the Linnean Society 163: 1217–1243. (Pinoyscincus llanosi, new combination).
Smith MA (1937). "A Review of the Genus Lygosoma (Scincidae: Reptilia) and its Allies". Records of the Indian Museum 39 (3): 213–234. (Otosaurus llanosi, new combination, p. 218).
Taylor EH (1919). "New or rare Philippine reptiles". Philippine Journal of Science 14: 105–125 + Plates I–II. (Sphenomorphus llanosi, new species, pp. 121–123 + Plate II).

Pinoyscincus
Reptiles described in 1919
Taxa named by Edward Harrison Taylor